Gossman is a surname. Notable people with the surname include:

Brian Gossman, Scottish rugby union player
F. Joseph Gossman (1930–2013), American Roman Catholic bishop
Jimmy Gossman, Scottish rugby union player
Lionel Gossman (1929–2021), Scottish-American scholar of French literature